Anand Sen Yadav is an Indian politician from the  Samajwadi Party .

Sen Yadav first won the 2002 elections from Milkipur, with the Samajwadi Party. And he won by- election in 2016 from Bikapur.

 He fought the 2007 Uttar Pradesh state assembly elections from jail. He won and was appointed Minister of State for food processing in Mayawati's cabinet. He was in jail during the swearing-in ceremony, and a court refused him leave since he was there on "serious criminal charges".  Eventually, a second ceremony was held for him. On 7 November 2007, Sen Yadav resigned from his ministerial post, and Mayawati initiated a probe.

.

Positions held

References

Prisoners and detainees of India
Indian politicians convicted of crimes
Indian prisoners and detainees
Living people
Uttar Pradesh MLAs 2002–2007
Uttar Pradesh MLAs 2007–2012
Criminals from Uttar Pradesh
Politicians convicted of murder
Year of birth missing (living people)